Gary Alexander is an American sound engineer. He won the Academy Award for Best Sound for the film Out of Africa. He worked on over 300 films from 1976 to 2011.

Selected filmography
 Out of Africa (1985)

References

External links

Year of birth missing (living people)
Living people
American audio engineers
Best Sound Mixing Academy Award winners
Best Sound BAFTA Award winners
Primetime Emmy Award winners